Ancient Judaism is an essay written by the German economist and sociologist Max Weber in the early 20th century. The original edition appeared in the 1917–1919 issues of the Archiv für Sozialwissenschaft und Sozialpolitik. Marianne Weber, his wife, published the essays as Part Three of his Gesammelte Aufsatze zur Religionssoziologie in 1920–1921. An English translation was made in 1952 and several editions were released since then.

It was his fourth and last major work on the sociology of religion, after The Protestant Ethic and the Spirit of Capitalism, The Religion of China: Confucianism and Taoism and The Religion of India: The Sociology of Hinduism and Buddhism. In this work he attempts to explain the factors that were responsible for the early differences between Oriental and Occidental religiosity. It is especially visible when the mysticism developed by Western Christianity is compared with the asceticism that flourished within the religious traditions of India. Weber's premature death in 1920 prevented him from following Ancient Judaism with his planned analysis of the Psalms, the Book of Job, Rabbinic Judaism, early Christianity and Islam.

Weber wrote that 

Weber notes that Judaism not only fathered Christianity and Islam, but was crucial to the rise of the modern Western world, as its influence was as important as those of Hellenistic and Greco-Roman civilizations.

Types of asceticism and the significance of ancient Judaism

Weber noted that some aspects of Christianity sought to conquer and change the world, instead of withdrawing from its imperfections. This fundamental distinctiveness of Christianity (when compared to Eastern religions) stems originally from ancient Jewish prophecy. Weber stated his reasons for investigating ancient Judaism:

History and social organization of Ancient Israel

Weber analysed the interaction between the Bedouins, the cities, the herdsmen and the peasants, the conflicts between them, and the rise and fall of United Monarchy of Israel and Judah. The brief time of United Monarchy divided the period of confederacy since the Exodus and the settlement of the Israelites in Canaan from the period of political decline following the division of the monarchy. Weber discusses the organisation of the early confederacy, the unique qualities of Israelite relations to the God of Israel, the influence of foreign cults, types of religious ecstasy and the struggle of the priests against ecstasy and idol worship. Later he describes the times of the Division of the Monarchy, social aspects of Biblical prophecy, social orientation of the prophets, demagogues and pamphleteers, ecstasy and politics, ethic and theodicity of the Prophets.

Those periods were significant for religious history, as the basic doctrines of Judaism that left their mark on Western civilisation arose during those times.

Reinhard Bendix summarising Weber's work writes:

See also
 External link section of Max Weber article for websites containing online works of Max Weber.

References

Further reading 
 Hans H. Gerth, Don Martindale (eds.), Max Weber. Ancient Judaism  Free Press, 1967, 
 Irving M. Zeitlin, Ancient Judaism: Biblical Criticism from Max Weber to the Present, Polity Press, 1986, 
 Jacob Neusner. Max Weber revisited: Religion and society in ancient Judaism. Oxford Centre for Postgraduate Hebrew Studies, 1981.
 Efraim Shmueli, The "Pariah People" and its "Charismatic Leadership"—A Reevaluation of Max Weber's "Ancient Judaism", Proceedings of the American Academy of Jewish Research New York, 1968, 167-247. 

1921 non-fiction books
1952 non-fiction books
Sociology books
Books about Judaism
Religion in ancient Israel and Judah
Works by Max Weber